SMS Panther was one of six Iltis-class gunboats of the Kaiserliche Marine that, like its sister ships, served in Germany's overseas colonies. The ship was launched on 1 April 1901 in the Kaiserliche Werft, Danzig. It had a crew of 9 officers and 121 men.

Design
She displaced  at full load. Her propulsion system consisted of a pair of vertical triple-expansion steam engines each driving a single screw propeller, with steam supplied by four coal-fired Thornycroft boilers. She had a crew of 9 officers and 121 enlisted men. Panther was armed with a main battery of two  SK L/40 guns, with 482 rounds of ammunition. She also carried six machine guns.

Service history
Panther was laid down at the Kaiserliche Werft (Imperial Shipyard) in Danzig in 1900. She was launched on 1 April 1901 and was commissioned into the German fleet on 15 March 1902.

In September 1902, after the Haitian rebel ship Crête-à-Pierrot hijacked the German steamer Markomannia and seized weapons destined for the Haitian government, Germany sent Panther to Haiti. Panther found the rebel ship. The rebel Admiral Killick evacuated his crew and blew up Crête-à-Pierrot, which was by then under fire from Panther. There were concerns about how the United States would view the action in the context of the Monroe Doctrine. But despite legal advice describing the sinking as "illegal and excessive", the US State Department endorsed the action. The New York Times declared that "Germany was quite within its rights in doing a little housecleaning on her own account".

Some months later, in December 1902, the Panther was in the German naval contingent during the naval blockade of Venezuela, during which she bombarded the settlement of Fort San Carlos, near Maracaibo. The shallow waters that connected lake Maracaibo with the sea were passable for major ships only in the strait that separated San Carlos from the island of Zapara, yet even there it needed the help of a local pilot to avoid the sand banks and shallow waters of the passage. The battle started when the fort's gunners opened fire as Panther was crossing the bar. Panther returned fire, but the shallow waters limited its effectiveness. Inside the fort, two gunners (Manuel Quevedo and Carlos José Cárdenas) managed to score several hits on Panther with their 80-millimeter Krupp gun, causing considerable damage. After half an hour of exchanging fire, the Germans retreated.

In 1905, Panther was sent to the Brazilian Port of Itajahy, where its crew conducted an unauthorized search in their pursuit of a German deserter by the name of Hassman. They ended up kidnapping, inexplicably, the German Fritz Steinhoff. This incident became known as the "Panther Affair" ("Caso Panther").

In October, 1906, Panther visited the Royal Naval Dockyard, in the British Imperial fortress colony of Bermuda, anchoring at Grassy Bay, the main anchorage of the squadron of the Royal Navy's North America and West Indies Station to the east of Ireland Island and in the mouth of the Great Sound. Members of the crew were hosted on Sunday, the 14 October 1906, by the Bermuda Volunteer Rifle Corps at the new St. George Hotel on Rose Hill at St. George's Town, to where they were carried from Grassy Bay by the steamer Gladisfen of the firm William E. Meyer and Company, Ltd (named for the Danzig-born progenitor of Bermuda's prominent Meyer family).

Agadir Crisis

Panther became notorious in 1911 when it was deployed to the Moroccan port of Agadir during the "Agadir Crisis" (also called the "Second Moroccan Crisis"). Panther was dispatched on the pretext of protecting (non-existent) German citizens in the port (a German sales representative, Hermann Wilberg, had been sent to Agadir on behalf of the Foreign office, but only arrived three days after Panther). The ship's actual mission was to apply pressure on the French, as the latter attempted to colonize Morocco, to extract territorial compensation in French Equatorial Africa. This was an example of "gunboat diplomacy". The incident contributed to the international tensions that would lead to the First World War.

The ship was scrapped in 1931.

Notes

References

Further reading

1901 ships
Ships built in Danzig
Iltis-class gunboats
World War I naval ships of Germany
Maritime incidents in 1902